Dark grass blue may refer to three butterfly species:
Zizeeria knysna
Zizeeria karsandra
Zizina antanossa